Sir Thomas Knyvett (also Knevitt or Knivet or Knevet), of Buckenham, Norfolk (c. 1485 – 10 August 1512) was a young English nobleman who was a close associate of King Henry VIII shortly after that monarch came to the throne. According to Hall's Chronicle, Knyvett was a frequent participant in the jousts and pageants of the new king's glittering court and was made Henry's Master of the Horse in 1510.

Family
Sir Thomas Knyvett was the son of Sir Edmund Knyvett (d.1504) of Buckenham by his wife Eleanor Tyrrell, the daughter of Sir William Tyrrell of Gipping, Suffolk by Margaret, daughter of Robert Darcy, knight. His mother Eleanor was sister of Sir James Tyrrell. He was the grandson of Sir William Knyvett.

Knyvett married, before 9 July 1506, Muriel Howard, the widow of John Grey, 2nd Viscount Lisle, by whom she was the mother of Elizabeth Grey, Viscountess Lisle, who was at one time betrothed to Charles Brandon, 1st Duke of Suffolk and later the wife of Henry Courtenay. Muriel Howard was the daughter of Thomas Howard, 2nd Duke of Norfolk, and Elizabeth Tilney, and through the Howard connection, Knyvett was related to many of the great figures of English history (his brother-in-law, for example, was Thomas Boleyn, father of Queen Anne, and grandfather of Queen Elizabeth I). By Muriel Howard Knyvett had three sons and two daughters, Edmund (1508–1551), Katherine who would marry Henry Paget, 2nd Baron Paget, Ferdinand, Anne and Henry (died c. 1546). Henry was the father of Sir Henry Knyvet and through him grandfather of the Katherine Knyvett who married her third cousin Thomas Howard, 1st Earl of Suffolk and is the ancestor of the Earls of Suffolk and Berkshire. Four months after her husband's death, Muriel Howard died in childbirth between 13 and 21 December 1512. Their five orphaned children were brought up by their grandmother, Eleanor Knyvett.

The actress and theatre director Sally Knyvette, who starred as Jenna Stannis in the British science fiction TV series Blake's 7, is a direct descendant of Sir Thomas Knyvet.

Death
When Henry declared war on France in 1512, Knyvett, along with Sir John Carew, was given command of the royal flagship, the Regent.  With a number of court favourites commanding other vessels, a small fleet set sail for the coast of Brittany. On 10 August 1512 they engaged a slightly smaller French fleet, and a violent melee known as the Battle of St. Mathieu ensued off the coast of Brest. Knyvett's ship grappled with the Breton command vessel Cordelière, and was engaged in boarding her when the Cordelière'''s powder magazine blew up (some say it was deliberately ignited). The two vessels burst into flame. Knyvett and Carew both perished, along with the Breton captain Hervé de Portzmoguer and more than 1,700 men, both French and English.

In fiction
On the TV series The Tudors'', a fictionalized Sir Anthony Knivert is based on Knyvett and played by Callum Blue.

References

Notes

People from Broadland (district)
16th-century English people
Thomas
English knights
English military personnel killed in action
1485 births
Year of birth uncertain
1512 deaths